Clam Pond is a small cove (despite its name) in the Great South Bay, on the north side of Fire Island between Saltaire and Fair Harbor in Suffolk County, New York. It is a popular spot for kayaking and small boat sailing.

See also
Fire Island
Great South Bay

Coves of the United States
Fire Island, New York
Bays of Suffolk County, New York
Bays of New York (state)